Bohumil Fidler (also Fiedler) (May 27, 1860 - June 2, 1944) was a Czech composer, choirmaster, choral conductor and music teacher. He was born in Příbram, where he lived and worked his entire life.

Biography 
Fidler was a foremost figure in the musical life of Příbram and the surrounding region.  Upon completing his education, he taught at the local teachers college until 1889,  and subsequently served as choir director at St. Jacob's Church.  
For more than 15 years Fidler was also the choirmaster of  Příbram's "Lumir-Dobromila" choral association.  Additionally, he founded the Příbram Philharmonic Orchestra and was its conductor from 1908-1913. He died in Příbram in 1944.

His autobiography, Můj život a vzpomínky (My Life and Memories), published in 1935, 
is noteworthy for its numerous recollections of his musical friendship with Czech composer Antonín Dvořák, as well as his experiences with many other lesser known Czech musicians.  An annotated English translation of these memoirs has recently been published by the Dvořák Society for Czech and Slovak Music.

Style 
Bohumil Fidler's compositions include two Missa brevi, two Pastorale Masses, a celebratory Mass for mixed choir, soloists, orchestra and organ, and numerous smaller works for chorus as well as songs for solo voice.  For the stage he wrote music for two fairy tales: Mikeš Lumidřevo and Zvířátka a Petrovští.  His Slavonic Waltz was composed for the Příbram Philharmonic Orchestra; he also wrote 20 funeral marches for military band.

Selected works 
Church music:
Missa solemnis in D major (1901) - performed in 1903
Missa pastoralis II. (1937)
Missa brevis
Slovenská vánoční mše

He wrote also compositions for mixed choirs and works for solo voice and solo violin.

Notes

References
Neil Butterworth (1980), "Dvořák", Omnibus Press, 
Otakar Šourek (1985), "Antonín Dvořák Letters and Reminiscences" translated from the Czech by Roberta Finlayson Samsour, Da Capo Press
Československý hudební slovník osob a institucí. 1. vyd. Sv. 1. Praha : Státní hudební vydavatelství, 1963, s. 318
Bohumil Fidler (1935), Můj život a vzpomínky, published by Pelz, Příbram
Sonya Szabo Reynolds, editor (2008), " Bohumil Fidler: 'My Life and Memories' ", The Dvorak Society for Czech and Slovak Music,  (soft bound),  (hard bound)

1860 births
1944 deaths
Czech composers
Czech male composers
Czech musicians
People from Příbram